is an old aphorism in Latin which means that the physician cures while nature heals.

Variations in Latin include natura sanat, medicus curat morbus and there are equivalents in other languages such as Franklin's sarcastic "God heals, and the Doctor takes the Fees" and Ambroise Paré's "Je le pansai, Dieu le guérit."  The phrase was used in medieval times and the idea has been traced back to classical authors such as Galen and Aristotle.    

Georg Groddeck made an acronym of the phrase which he used as the title of his 1913 book, Nasamecu.

See also 
Nature cure (disambiguation)
Nature therapy
Naturopathy
Vis medicatrix naturae

References

Aphorisms
Latin words and phrases